Chilean salad or ensalada chilena is a salad containing tomato, onion, coriander and olive oil, and sometimes chili peppers.

The onion may be soaked in boiling salted water, to soften it and reduce its sharpness. It may also be soaked in cold water for an hour or so, or marinated with vinegar.

See also
 List of salads

References 

Salads
Chilean cuisine